Wilson Heights was a provincial electoral district in Ontario, Canada.  It was created prior to the 1975 provincial election and eliminated in 1999, when most of its territory was incorporated into the ridings of York Centre, Willowdale and Eglinton—Lawrence.  Wilson Heights was located in the neighbourhood of Wilson Heights in the former municipality of North York, which is now part of Toronto.

Three Members of Provincial Parliament represented the riding during its history.  The first, Liberal Vern Singer, was a veteran provincial politician who had previously represented the York Centre and Downsview ridings.  He retired in 1977 and was replaced by Progressive Conservative David Rotenberg, who briefly served as a minister without portfolio in Frank Miller's government.  Its longest-serving representative was Monte Kwinter, who defeated Rotenberg in the 1985 provincial election and held the riding for fourteen years until its dissolution.  Kwinter was a cabinet minister in the government of David Peterson, and now represents York Centre.

The Wilson Heights division had a significant Jewish population, at almost 40% of the total population.

Members of Provincial Parliament

Election results

References

Notes

Citations

Former provincial electoral districts of Ontario
Provincial electoral districts of Toronto